USS Pitt (APA-223/LPA-223) was a  in service with the United States Navy from 1944 to 1947. She was scrapped in 1980.

History
Pitt was of the VC2-S-AP5 Victory ship design type and named after Pitt County, North Carolina. She was laid down on 8 September 1944, under a Maritime Commission (MARCOM) contract, MCV hull 571, by Permanente Metals Corporation, Yard No. 2, Richmond, California; launched on 10 November 1944; sponsored by Mrs. Gwin Fallis; and commissioned on 11 December 1944.

Pacific War
After shakedown off the California coast, Pitt departed 10 February 1945, via Pearl Harbor and Eniwetok, for Ulithi Atoll, Caroline Islands, to join 600 other ships preparing for the invasion of Okinawa. She unloaded half of her ammunition cargo there, and the rest at Leyte.

Invasion of Okinawa

After loading US Army troops from the damaged attack transport ), she steamed for Kerama Retto where her troops cleaned out Zamami Shima, a key island in the small group off the southwest coast of Okinawa.

She then became "receiving ship" for the Kerama Retto Naval Base, caring for several hundred survivors of Japanese suicide attacks, and shooting down one suicide plane on 6 April. Pitt steamed to Saipan, Tulagi, Noumea, and Guam before returning with passengers to San Francisco, California, for the celebrations of the Japanese surrender.

Operation Magic Carpet
On 19 August, Pitt sailed via Ulithi to Mindanao and Leyte, where she loaded troops to occupy Aomori, northern Honshū, Japan, on 25 September. Pitt then began a series of Operation Magic Carpet assignments, returning fighting men to the States from such Pacific Ocean locations as Saipan and Tinian, Manila, and Nagoya, Japan.

Decommissioning and fate
She decommissioned and was transferred to the Maritime Commission (MARCOM) on 9 April 1947, and was struck from the Naval Vessel Register on 23 April 1947. Placed in the National Defense Reserve Fleet, was laid up in the National Defense Reserve Fleet, Suisun Bay Group, Benicia, California. She was briefly removed from the fleet 13 September 1954, by Pope & Talbet until 22 October 1954, under a Repair Program. On 14 August 1968, the designation “attack transport”, APA, was changed to “amphibious transport”, LPA, and APA-223 became LPA-223. She was then sold to Carol Shipping & Trading Corporation, Liberia, who sold her to Kang Hiva Enterprise, Kaohsiung, Taiwan, to be scrapped. She was withdrawn from the fleet 14 April 1980.

Honors and awards 
Pitt received one battle star for World War II service.

Notes 

Citations

Bibliography 

Online resources

External links

 

Haskell-class attack transports
Pitt County, North Carolina
Transports of the United States Navy
World War II amphibious warfare vessels of the United States
Ships built in Richmond, California
1944 ships
Suisun Bay Reserve Fleet